The Business, Consumer Services and Housing Agency (BCSH) is the California government cabinet-level agency that assists and educates consumers regarding the licensing, regulation, and enforcement of professionals and businesses.

Organization 
 Department of Consumer Affairs (DCA)
 Department of Fair Employment and Housing (DFEH)
 Department of Housing and Community Development (HCD)
 Department of Financial Protection and Innovation (DFPI)
 Department of Real Estate (DRE)
 Department of Alcoholic Beverage Control (ABC)
 Alcoholic Beverage Control Appeals Board
 California Horse Racing Board (CHRB)
 California Seismic Safety Commission

References

External links 
 
 Title 16 Professional and Vocational Regulations of the California Code of Regulations from Thomson Reuters
 Title 4 Business Regulations of the California Code of Regulations from Thomson Reuters

Business, Consumer Services and Housing Agency
2013 establishments in California